Hansraj Behl (19 November 1916 – 20 May 1984) was an Indian music composer, who composed music both for Hindi and Punjabi films.

Early life and education
Born in Ambala, British Punjab, Hansraj received his early education in music from Pandit Chunnilal. His father was a zamindar (landlord) in his area.

Career
Hansraj Behl opened a music school in Anarkali Bazaar, Lahore, Punjab, British India and released a few non-film records through His Master's Voice (HMV). Hansraj, along with his younger brother Gulshan Behl and later day  poet and film songs lyricist Verma Malik, travelled to Bombay in 1944 to pursue a career as a music director in Hindi film industry. His uncle Chunnilal Behl introduced him to the famous actor Prithviraj Kapoor. He managed to make his debut as a composer with film Pujari (1946), directed by Ardeshir Irani. He introduced the noted playback singer Asha Bhosle who made her Hindi film debut when she sang, along with Zohrabai Ambalewali,  the song Saawan aaya for Hansraj Behl's film Chunariya (1948).

In 1964 he gave music for hit Punjabi film by Padam Prakash Maheshwary titled Satluj De Kandhe, starring Balraj Sahni, Nishi, Wasti, and Mirza Musharraf. The patriotic hit, "Jahan Daal Daal Pe Sone Ki Chidiya Karti Hai Basera.." sung by Mohammed Rafi in the film Sikandar-e-Aazam (1965), starring Prithviraj Kapoor was one of his last memorable number. Hansraj Behl and Master Ghulam Haider are widely considered to be two well-respected music directors of Indian Film Industry even among the musicians.

He worked with film song lyricists like Pandit Indra Chandra, D. N. Madhok, Prem Dhawan, Verma Malik, Asad Bhopali, Qamar Jalalabadi and Naqsh Lyallpuri during his four-decade-long career and scored music for nearly 67 films.

Filmography
 Pujari (1946)
 Phoolwari (1946)
 Lachhi (1949 film)(Punjabi-language Movie) 
 Chhai (1950) Punjabi Movie 
 Shaan (1950)
 Chunariya (1948)
 Chakori (1949)
 Karwat (1949) for B. R. Chopra
 Khiladi (1950)
 Khamosh Sipahi (1950)
 Nakhre (1951)
  Miss Bombay (1957) 
 Rajput (1951)
 Moti Mahal (1952)
 Jaggu (1952)
 Apni Izzat (1952)
 Lal Pari (1954)
 Dost (1954)
 Mast Qalandar (1955)
  Rajdhani (1956)
 Changez Khan (1957)
 Milan (1958)
 Bhangra (film) (1959) - Punjabi 
 Sawan (1959) 
Do Lachhian (1959) Punjabi Movie 
 Mud Mud Ke Na Dekh (1960)
 Satluj De Kandhe (1964) - Punjabi Movie 
 Sikandar E Azam (1965)
 Rustom-E-Hind (1965)
 Do Aankhen (1974)
  Sher Puttar (1977) Punjabi Movie 
 Jai Mata Di (1977) Punjabi Movie 
 Jatt Punjabi (1979) - Punjabi Movie 
 Kunwara Mama (1979) - Punjabi 
 Chaska (1981) - Punjabi Movie 
 Jatt Da Gandasa (1982) - Punjabi Movie
 Jeeja Sali (1985)- Punjabi Movie 
 Insaaf Ka Khoon (1991)

References

External links
 

1916 births
1984 deaths
People from Ambala
Indian film score composers
Cinema of Punjab
20th-century composers
20th-century Indian musicians
Singers from Haryana
20th-century Indian male singers
20th-century Indian singers
Films scored by Hansraj Behl